The Donner Prize is an award given annually by one of Canada's largest foundations, the Donner Canadian Foundation, for books considered excellent in regard to the writing of Canadian public policy. The prize was established in 1998 and is meant to encourage an open exchange of ideas and to provide a springboard for authors who can make an original and meaningful contribution to policy discourse. The Donner Canadian Foundation also established the prize to recognize and reward the best public policy thinking, writing and research by a Canadian, and the role it plays in determining the well-being of Canadians and the success of Canada as a whole.  

The grand prize is $50,000 and short-listed finalists receive $7,500 each. To be eligible, a book must be on a single theme relevant to Canadian policy and be authored by one or more Canadian citizens. Entries are submitted by publishers, and selected by a five-person jury whose members are drawn from the ranks of Canadian professors, university administrators, businessmen, and politicians. The committee announces a short list in April of each year. The winners and runners-up are announced at an awards banquet in April or May.

Winners

2020: Joseph Heath, The Machinery of Government: Public Administration and the Liberal State
2019: Dennis McConaghy, Breakdown: The Pipeline Debate and the Threat to Canada’s Future
2018: Thomas J. Courchene, Indigenous Nationals, Canadian Citizens: From First Contact to Canada 150 and Beyond
2017: Patricia Meredith, James L. Darroch, Stumbling Giants: Transforming Canada's Banks for the Information Age
2016: Alex Marland, Brand Command: Canadian Politics and Democracy in the Age of Message Control
2015: Donald J. Savoie, What Is Government Good At? A Canadian Answer
2014: Michael J. Trebilcock, Dealing With Losers: The Political Economy of Policy Transitions
2013: Michael Byers, International Law and the Arctic
2012: Jeffrey Simpson, Chronic Condition: Why Canada’s Health Care System Needs to be Dragged into the 21st Century.
2011: Peter Aucoin, Mark D. Jarvis, Lori Turnbull, Democratizing The Constitution
2010: Doug Saunders, Arrival City: The Final Migration and Our Next World
2009: Brian Bow, The Politics of Linkage: Power, Interdependence and Ideas in Canada–US Relations.
2008: Ken Coates, P. Whitney Lackenbauer, William R. Morrison, and Greg Poelzer, Arctic Front: Defending Canada in the Far North.
2007: David E. Smith, The People's House of Commons: Theories of Democracy in Contention.
2006: Eric Helleiner, Towards North American Monetary Union? The Politics and History of Canada's Exchange Rate Regime.
2005: Mark Jaccard, Sustainable Fossil Fuels: The Unusual Suspect in the Quest for Clean and Enduring Energy.
2004: David Laidler & William Robson, Two Percent Target: Canadian Monetary Policy Since 1991.
2003: Michael Adams, Fire and Ice: The United States, Canada, and the Myth of Converging Values.
2002: John F. Helliwell, Globalization and Well-Being.
2001: Marie McAndrew, Immigration et diversité à l'école.
2000: Tom Flanagan, First Nation? Second Thoughts.
1999: David Gratzer, Code Blue: Reviving Canada's Health Care System.
1998: Thomas Courchene with Colin Termer, From Heartland to North American Region-State: The Social, Fiscal, and Federal Evolution of Ontario.

References

External links
Donner Prize, official website

Canadian non-fiction literary awards
Awards established in 1998
1998 establishments in Canada
Political book awards